is a former Japanese football player. He played for Japan national team.

Club career
Yamaguchi was born in Kumamoto Prefecture on November 19, 1971. After dropped out from Kindai University, he joined Gamba Osaka in 1993. He became a regular player from 1994. He moved to Kyoto Purple Sanga in 1996 and played until 1997. In June 1998, he signed with Sanfrecce Hiroshima. The club won the 2nd place at 1999 Emperor's Cup. He retired end of 2000 season.

National team career
On July 8, 1994, Yamaguchi debuted for Japan national team against Ghana. He also played at 1995 King Fahd Cup. He played 4 games for Japan until 1995.

Club statistics

National team statistics

References

External links

 
 Japan National Football Team Database
 

1971 births
Living people
Kindai University alumni
Association football people from Kumamoto Prefecture
Japanese footballers
Japan international footballers
J1 League players
Gamba Osaka players
Kyoto Sanga FC players
Sanfrecce Hiroshima players
1995 King Fahd Cup players
Association football forwards
Association football midfielders